Mehigan is an Irish surname. It comes from the Irish Gaelic name Ó Miadhacháin that derives from "Miadhach", which means "honourable". There are over a dozen variations on the surname, including Meighan, Meaghan, Mehegan, Megan, Meegan and Meehan.

Notable people with the surname Mehigan include:
Denis Mehigan (1890), Irish Gaelic footballer
Gary Mehigan (1967), English-Australian chef and restaurateur
Irving P. Mehigan (1898), American state senator for Wisconsin
Joshua Mehigan (1969), American poet.
Mick Mehigan (1887), Irish Gaelic footballer
P.D. Mehigan (1884–1965), Irish sportsperson and journalist

Those with the Meighan variation include:
Clement Woodward Meighan (1925–1997), archaeologist
Hunter Meighan (1914–2008), New York politician
John Meighan (1891–1978), Irish politician
Patrick Meighan (born 1949), American saxophonist
Ron Meighan (1963), Canadian ice hockey defenceman
Thomas Meighan (1879–1936), American actor of silent films and early talkies
Tom Meighan (1981), English musician, the lead vocalist of Kasabian
Mickey L Meighan (1969), Irish American, Natural Gas Industries

Those with the Meighen variation include:
 Arthur Meighen (1874–1960), Canadian lawyer and politician who became Prime Minister, after whom the following locations in Canada are named:
 Meighen Island, an uninhabited member of the Queen Elizabeth Islands
 Mount Arthur Meighen, a mountain in the Premier Range of the Cariboo Mountains, British Columbia
 Isabel Meighen (1882–1985), the wife of Arthur Meighen
 Lillian Meighen Wright (1910–1993), Canadian philanthropist, and daughter of Arthur and Isabel Meighen
 Maxwell Meighen (1908–1992), Canadian financier, and son of Arthur and Isabel Meighen
 Michael Meighen (born 1939), Canadian lawyer, cultural patron and former senator, and son of Theodore Meighen
 Richard Meighen (died 1641), London publisher
 Theodore Meighen (1905–1979), Canadian lawyer and philanthropist and the son of Arthur and Isabel Meighen

See also
 Meehan, another variation of the surname
 McMeekin, a usually Scottish variation of the surname
 Megan, a Welsh given name that has variants Meaghan and Meighan

External links
Mehigan at the House of Names
Meighan at the Surname Database

Anglicised Irish-language surnames